Buloburde District is a district in the central Hiran region of Somalia. Its capital lies at Buloburde.

References
Districts of Somalia

External links
 Administrative map of Buloburde District

Districts of Somalia

Hiran, Somalia